Aditya Om (born 5 October 1975) is an Indian actor and director who works predominately in Hindi and Telugu films. He also did theatre and serials. He debuted with Lahiri Lahiri Lahirilo (2002) as an actor and directed Bandook (2013). He got many best actor awards at various film festivals for his Telugu film Dahnam.

Career
Aditya Om made his film debut as an actor with the Telugu-language multistarrer Lahiri Lahiri Lahirilo (2002) under the stage name Aditya. One critic noted that "Aditya['s] dialogue delivery is pretty bad and he overacted in most of the scenes" while another said that "Aditya is a poor choice to play such an important role". In his next film Dhanalakshmi, I Love You (2002), his performance was better received with a critic writing that "Aditya surprises us with his good histrionics" and another stated he "fit[s] perfectly" in his role. Aditya Om went on to star in several Telugu films including Mee Intikoste Em Istaaru Maa Intkoste Em Testaaru (2004) and Preminchukunnam Pelliki Randi (2004). During this time, he made his debut as a director with the silent film Mr Lonely Miss Lovely (2004). He has directed and acted in critically acclaimed film Bandook (2013). In regards to his performance, a critic opined that "Actor-director Aditya Om plays his part with conviction". The script of Bandook is a part of the Oscars library. The Hindi feature film Maassab (2018) directed by Aditya Om has won awards at various national and international film festivals.

He is actively involved in charity, social work and has adopted a village Cherupally in Telangana. He is also working for educational reforms with his organisation "Edulightment". He has constructed a library there and has opened digital service center and given laptops and solar lights to village school and people. He is working tirelessly for educational reforms under his organisation Edulightment; welfare of Tribals in Telangana, Auto drivers in Mumbai, and is also involved in human rights associations.

Filmography
Aditya Om acted Hindi OTT film ' quota 'got much appreciation . ' Pavithra ' another short film by Aditya Om was one of the most watched Telugu shorts of 2022. His forthcoming Hindi films are ' Bagawat ' . ' Bandi' . His directed Hindi film ' Maila 'was selected at NFDC recommends section of 2021 film bazaar Goa. At present Aditya Om is directing a Hindi biopic of Sant Tukaram. 
At the end of 2022 Aditya Om started an ambulance service for his adopted villages of Cherupally and Kothapalli.

As an actor

As a director

As a co-producer
Shudra: The Rising (2012)
Dozakh in Search of Heaven (2015)

References

External links

1975 births
Living people
Indian male film actors
Male actors in Telugu cinema
Hindi-language film directors
Male actors in Hindi cinema